Priscilla Lee Taylor (born August 15, 1971) is an American model and actress. She is Playboy magazine's Playmate of the Month for March 1996.  Her centerfold was photographed by Richard Fegley.

Taylor started modelling at age 12. She co-starred on a teen sitcom Malibu, CA as Traycee Banks. Taylor is also the founder and owner of "Dutchess Couture". She was also a competitor in the Playboy Playmate episode of Fear Factor in 2002. In addition to being an actor, Priscilla is also a film producer.

Taylor gained more attention for her role in Gothic Assassins, co-starring alongside Steven Bauer.

Filmography

Film

Television

References

External links
 
 
 

People from Miami
Living people
1990s Playboy Playmates
1976 births